Rory O'Connell is a former Gaelic footballer from Athlone, County Westmeath. He was Westmeath's first  Football All Stars winner in 2001. He was also part of the Westmeath team that won the county's first Leinster Senior Football Championship in 2004. He played his club football for Athlone.

Honours
 Leinster Senior Football Championship (1): 2004
 National Football League, Division 2 (2): 2001, 2003
 Railway Cup (2): 2001, 2002
 GAA GPA All Stars Awards (1): 2001

References
 http://hoganstand.com/westmeath/ArticleForm.aspx?ID=30597
 http://hoganstand.com/westmeath/ArticleForm.aspx?ID=30516

Living people
Athlone Gaelic footballers
Westmeath inter-county Gaelic footballers
Year of birth missing (living people)